Chloritis is a genus of air-breathing land snails, terrestrial pulmonate gastropod mollusks in the subfamily Hadrinae of the family Camaenidae.

The genus Chloritis is restricted to South-east Asia (from China to India and up to New Guinea) with numerous species having usually small distributional ranges.

Shell description 
The conchological characters of the species belonging to the genus Chloritis are the more or less compact shells, the biconcave or a hardly elevated spire. The first whorls are quite narrow, rounded, the apical ones with regularly arranged granules or hair pits. Last whorl is widened suddenly, with a more or less open umbilicus. The aperture is lunate. The peristome is reflected, connected in most cases by a thin callus.

Species
Some researchers divided the genus Chloritis in a number of rather poorly defined subgenera, or even consider these subgenera as genera. The characters used for these separations are only shell features; unfortunately from only a few species the anatomy is known. Here the more conservative systematic classification (only one genus Chloritis) is followed as proposed by Vaught (1989).

Species within the genus Chloritis include:

 Chloritis abletti Thach & F. Huber, 2018
 Chloritis addita I. Rensch, 1935
 Chloritis balansai (Morlet, 1886)
 Chloritis balatensis (Kobelt, 1896) - from Sulawesi
 Chloritis beddomei Gude, 1906
 Chloritis bellonensis (Clench, 1958)
 Chloritis bifoveata (Benson, 1856) - from West Malaysia
 Chloritis biomphala (L. Pfeiffer, 1862) - from Sulawesi
 Chloritis camaratus Dall, 1910
 Chloritis caseus (L. Pfeiffer, 1860)
 Chloritis ceramensis (L. Pfeiffer, 1861)
 Chloritis circumdata (A.E.J. Férussac, 1821)
 Chloritis concisa (Férussac, 1823)
 Chloritis crassula (Philippi, 1844)
 Chloritis delibrata (Benson, 1836)
 Chloritis deliciosa (L. Pfeiffer, 1863)
 Chloritis dentrecasteauxi (E. A. Smith, 1884)
 Chloritis diplochone Möllendorff, 1898
 Chloritis discordialis (Deshayes, 1839)
 Chloritis durandi (Bavay & Dautzenberg, 1900)
 Chloritis eustoma (Pfeiffer, 1857)
 Chloritis flexuosa (L. Pfeiffer, 1855)
 Chloritis fraudulenta Gude, 1906: synonym of Sulcobasis fraudulenta (Gude, 1906)
 Chloritis gabata (Gould, 1844)
 Chloritis gaymardi (Deshayes, 1831)
 Chloritis gruneri (L. Pfeiffer, 1845) - from Sulawesi
 Chloritis helicinoides (Mousson, 1848)
 Chloritis heteromphalus Pilsbry, 1906
 Chloritis holoserica Gude, 1906
 Chloritis howesii E. A. Smith, 1896
 Chloritis huberi Thach, 2016 (taxon inquirendum)
 Chloritis impotens Pilsbry & Y. Hirase, 1908
 Chloritis johannisi Cilia, 2010
 Chloritis khammouanensis Inkhavilay & Panha, 2019
 Chloritis klausgrohi Thach & F. Huber, 2017
 Chloritis leithi Gude, 1914
 Chloritis lemeslei (Morlet, 1891)
 Chloritis leytensis Möllendorff, 1890
 Chloritis macrostoma Gude, 1906 - from Sulawesi
 Chloritis malayana (Möllendorff, 1887)
 Chloritis mansonensis Gude, 1906: synonym of Trichochloritis mansonensis (Gude, 1906) (original combination)
 Chloritis marimberti (Bavay & Dautzenberg, 1900)
 Chloritis martensi (L. Pfeiffer, 1861)
 Chloritis mertensi I. Rensch, 1930
 Chloritis mima Fulton, 1899
 Chloritis minahassae P. & F. Sarasin, 1899 - from Sulawesi
 Chloritis molliseta (L. Pfeiffer, 1863)
 Chloritis nasuta (Bavay & Dautzenberg, 1909)
 Chloritis norodomiana (Morlet, 1883)
 Chloritis pervicina E. A. Smith, 1897
 Chloritis planorbina Haas, 1912 - from Sulawesi
 Chloritis platytropis Möllendorff, 1894
 Chloritis polingi (Clench, 1957)
 Chloritis procumbens (Gould, 1843)
 Chloritis propinqua (Pfeiffer, 1857)
 Chloritis quadrivolvis (Martens, 1865)
 Chloritis quercina (Pfeiffer, 1857)
 Chloritis remoratrix (Morlet, 1893)
 Chloritis sanziana (Hombron & Jacquinot, 1849)
 Chloritis selenitoides Fulton, 1899
 Chloritis siamensis Möllendorff, 1902
 Chloritis spinosissima C. Semper, 1880
 Chloritis subsulcata Möllendorff, 1894
 Chloritis sumbawana B. Rensch, 1930
 Chloritis talabensis (Kobelt, 1896) - from Sulawesi
 Chloritis tenella (L. Pfeiffer, 1862)
 Chloritis teres Gude, 1906
 Chloritis tetragyra Möllendorff, 1897
 Chloritis thachi F. Huber, 2018
 Chloritis theobaldi Gude, 1914
 Chloritis togianensis Maassen, 2009 - from Sulawesi
 Chloritis transversalis (Mousson, 1857)
 Chloritis unguiculastra (Martens, 1867)
 Chloritis ungulina (Linnaeus, 1758) - type species
 Chloritis vanbruggeni Maassen, 2009 - from Sulawesi
 Chloritis vinhensis Thach & F. Huber, 2018

References
This article incorporates CC-BY-3.0 text from the reference.

Camaenidae